{{DISPLAYTITLE:C21H30O3}}
The molecular formula C21H30O3 (molar mass: 330.46 g/mol, exact mass: 330.2195 u) may refer to:

 11-Deoxycorticosterone
 3'-Hydroxy-THC
 11-Hydroxy-THC
 11-Hydroxy-Delta-8-THC
 7-Hydroxycannabidiol
 Hydroxyprogesterones
 11α-Hydroxyprogesterone
 11β-Hydroxyprogesterone
 16α-Hydroxyprogesterone
 17α-Hydroxyprogesterone
 16-O-Methylcafestol
 Nandrolone propionate
 Trestolone acetate
 Testosterone acetate